Arabic and its different dialects are spoken by around 422 million speakers (native and non-native) in the Arab world as well as in the Arab diaspora making it one of the five most spoken languages in the world. Currently, 22 countries are member states of the Arab League (as well as 5 countries were granted an observer status) which was founded in Cairo in 1945. Arabic is a language cluster comprising 30 or so modern varieties.

Arabic is the lingua franca of people who live in countries of the Arab world as well as of Arabs who live in the diaspora, particularly in Latin America (especially Brazil, Argentina, Venezuela, Chile and Colombia) or Western Europe (like France, Spain, Germany or Italy).

Cypriot Arabic is a recognized minority language in the EU member state of Cyprus and, along with Maltese, is one of only two extant European varieties of Arabic, though it has its own standard literary form and has no diglossic relationship with Standard Arabic.
Maltese is one of the official languages of the EU.

Sovereign states where Arabic is an official language 
As of 2018, there are 23 sovereign states where Modern Standard Arabic is an official language. The following is a list of sovereign states and territories where Arabic is an official language.

States with limited recognition and territories where Arabic is an official language 
The following is a list of states with limited recognition as well as territories where Arabic is an official or de facto official language.

Countries where Arabic is a national/working language or a recognized minority language 
As of 2016, there are 7 independent countries where Arabic is a national/working language or a recognized minority language, but not primary language. The following is a list of sovereign states and territories where Arabic is a national language or a recognized minority language.

Cyprus 

Cypriot Arabic (alongside Armenian) is one of the two recognized minority languages of Cyprus, since 2008. It is spoken by the Maronite community, which is a minority in Cyprus especially in the cities Nicosia, Limassol and Larnaca.

Cypriot Arabic (also known as Cypriot Maronite Arabic) is taught at the Elementary School of St. Maron, which is located in Anthoupolis southern of Nicosia, Cyprus.

Eritrea 

Debate exists over the extent of Arabic in Eritrea; the government position is that the language was introduced by the British and is only in use by a professional elite and the Rashaida minority, whereas others have taken the view the language acts as the lingua franca of the country's Muslims. Eritrea is an observer state in the Arab League.

Iran 

Arabic is a recognized minority language of Iran. In addition, the constitution recognizes the Arabic language as the language of Islam, giving it a formal status as the language of religion, and regulates its spreading within the Iranian national curriculum. After the Islamic Revolution in 1979, Arabic (as the language of Quran) became mandatory for pupils in Iran. Arabic courses are mandatory starting from 6th year of schooling (1st year of Middle School) until the 11th year (penultimate year of High School).

The local dialects of Arabic spoken by Arab minorities in Iran (like Ahwazi Arabs, Khamseh Arabs, Marsh Arabs as well as Arabs in Khorasan) are Khuzestani Arabic and Mesopotamian Arabic, (also known as Iraqi Arabic) mainly in Khuzestan Province as well as Khorasani Arabic especially in Khorasan Province.

There are several TV channels in Arabic language broadcasting from Iran, namely, Al-Alam, Al-Kawthar TV, iFilm, Ahwazna TV, Al Ahwaz TV and Al-Ahvaz TV. Currently, the sole newspaper in Arabic language published in Iran is Kayhan Al Arabi out of 23 Persian dailies and three English dailies newspapers in Iran.

In 2008, the public university Payame Noor University declared that Arabic will be the "second language" of the university, and that all its services will be offered in Arabic, concurrent with Persian.

Mali 

Arabic is one of the recognized national languages in Mali. Hassaniya Arabic (a variety of Maghrebi Arabic) is spoken by a minority in Mali especially by the Azawagh Arabs (also known as nomadic Moors) nomadic ethnic Arab-ancestry tribes who are settling mainly in the area of Azawagh which is a dry basin covering what is today northwestern Niger, as well as parts of northeastern Mali and southern Algeria.

Niger 

Arabic is one of the recognized national languages in Niger. Arabic is spoken by a minority in Niger especially by the Diffa Arabs (also known as Mahamid Arabs) an Arab nomadic tribespeople who is living in eastern Niger, mostly in the Diffa Region.

Senegal 

Arabic is one of the recognized national languages in Senegal. Hassaniya Arabic is spoken by a minority in Senegal.

Turkey 

There is an Arab minority in Turkey who speak Arabic as their native language. Therefore, Arabic is a recognized minority language in Turkey.

Historically Arabic was the official language (in the territory which form nowadays the state of Turkey) during the time when this region was a part of the Umayyad Caliphate between 661 and 750 and later when it belonged to the Abbasid Caliphate (750–1258).

The national public broadcaster of Turkey the Turkish Radio and Television Corporation (also known as TRT) broadcasts TRT Al Arabiya a 24 hours a day TV channel in Arabic language (launched in April 2010).

The Arab Christian (Antiochian Greek Christians) minority has the right to teach Arabic under the Treaty of Lausanne, however they tend to refrain from doing so in order to avoid sectarian tensions as the treaty does not apply to the Muslim majority.

In 2015, the Turkey's Ministry of Education announced that as of the 2016–17 academic year, Arabic language courses (as a second language) will be offered to students in elementary school starting in second grade. The Arabic courses will be offered as an elective language course like German, French and English which are already being offered to elementary school students for a long time. According to a prepared curriculum, second and third graders will start learning the Arabic language by listening-comprehension and speaking, while introduction to writing will join these skills in fourth grade and after fifth grade students will start learning the language in all its four basic skills.

Countries where Arabic has a special status according to the constitution 
As of 2018, there are 5 independent countries where Arabic has a special status according to the constitution. The following is a list of sovereign states and territories where Arabic has a special status according to the constitution.

Iran 

The constitution of the Islamic Republic of Iran recognizes the Arabic language as the language of Islam, giving it a formal status as the language of religion, and regulates its spreading within the Iranian national curriculum. The constitution declares in Chapter II: (The Official Language, Script, Calendar, and Flag of the Country) in Article 16 "Since the language of the Qur`an and Islamic texts and teachings is Arabic, ..., it must be taught after elementary level, in all classes of secondary school and in all areas of study."

Israel 

Arabic was an official language of Mandatory Palestine and was retained as an official language when the State of Israel was founded in 1948. In 2018, the Knesset upgraded the status of Hebrew from official to State language of Israel, and gave Arabic a special status in the State by adopting the relevant Basic Law. The Basic Law: Israel as the Nation-State of the Jewish People (an Israeli Basic Law which specifies the nature of the State of Israel as the nation-state of the Jewish People) states in No. 4 (B) that "The Arabic language has a special status in the state; Regulating the use of Arabic in state institutions or by them will be set in law." The law declares in No. 4 (C): "This clause does not harm the status given to the Arabic language before this law came into effect." The law was adopted by the Knesset 62 in favor, 55 against and two abstentions on 19 July 2018.

Arabic is an indigenous language in the territory which form the state of Israel and which is still the lingua franca of Arab citizens of Israel as well as of Arab foreigners (especially Palestinians who have only a Palestinian Authority passport, not recognized by many countries. Thus, they consider Palestinians stateless). In addition, Arabic is spoken by Arab Jews in Israel who immigrated from different Arab countries to Israel (as Aliyah) and got the Israeli citizenship according to the Israeli Nationality Law of 1952.

Arabic name is shown on some Arabic majority cities seal.

It is semi-official and used in ethnically mixed cities including Jerusalem, Haifa, and Tel Aviv-Yafo, as well as on most highway signage, official websites, and public buildings in areas with significant Arabic-speaking populations.

Pakistan 

Historically Arabic was the official language (in the territory which form nowadays the state Islamic Republic of Pakistan) during the time when this region was a part of the Umayyad Caliphate between 651 and 750.

According to the Constitution of Pakistan of 1956 the two languages Urdu (which is very close to Hindi, both also called Hindustani language which were two of the lingua franca of North India and Pakistan that time) as well as Bengali (at that time the lingua franca in the territory which is today the independent state Bangladesh) became the national languages in the new founded state Islamic Republic of Pakistan. General Ayub Khan the second President of Pakistan advocated the institution of Arabic language teaching as part of national planning. "Ayub`s educational plan emphasized Urdu and English as the primary language of Pakistan, but additionally recommended that Arabic be a secondary language of instruction along with English."

The Arabic language is mentioned in the constitution of Pakistan. It declares in article 31 No. 2 that "The State shall endeavour, as respects the Muslims of Pakistan (a) to make the teaching of the Holy Quran and Islamiat compulsory, to encourage and facilitate the learning of Arabic language ..."

There is also an Arab minority in Pakistan. In addition, a remarkable number of Pakistanis are able to speak Arabic as they were living in the rich GCC Countries for working reasons (in Saudi Arabia around 2.5 million; in UAE around 1.5 million; in Qatar around 650,000; in Kuwait around 430,000; in Oman around 300,000; in Bahrain around 180,000) for a very long time. These overseas Pakistanis who are living in countries of the Arab world are also named Arab Pakistanis or Pakistani Arabs.

The National Education Policy 2017 declares in article 3.7.4 that: “Arabic as compulsory part will be integrated in Islamiyat from Middle to Higher Secondary level to enable the students to understand the Holy Quran.“ Furthermore, it specifies in article 3.7.6: “Arabic as elective subject shall be offered properly at Secondary and Higher Secondary level with Arabic literature and grammar in its course to enable the learners to have command in the language.“ This law is also valid for private schools as it defines in article 3.7.12: “The curriculum in Islamiyat, Arabic and Moral Education of public sector will be adopted by the private institutions to make uniformity in the society.“

In 2021, Pakistan's upper house of parliament approved the ‘Compulsory Teaching of the Arabic Language Bill 2020’ which makes the teaching of Arabic mandatory at all primary and secondary schools in the capital, Islamabad. The text of the bill says that Arabic should be taught from the first to the fifth grade and Arabic grammar should be taught from the sixth grade to the eleventh grade. The main reasons are Arabic would open up more job opportunities for Pakistanis in the Middle East and lead to lower unemployment and increased remittances as well as Arabic is the language of the Holy Quran. Making it compulsory at school level will help to improve the understanding of the Holy Quran in its true spirit.

Philippines 

The Arabic language is mentioned in the Philippine constitution of 1986. It specifies that "Spanish and Arabic shall be promoted on a voluntary and optional basis."

Arabic is mainly used by some Filipino Muslims in both a liturgical and instructional capacity since the arrival of Islam and establishment of several Sultanates (like Sultanate of Maguindanao, Sultanate of Sulu and Sultanate of Ranaw) and during Bruneian Empire in the present-day state Philippines. Along with Malay, Arabic was the lingua franca of the Malay Archipelago among Muslim traders and the Malay aristocracy in the Philippines' history. Arabic is taught for free and is promoted in some Islamic centres predominantly in the southernmost parts of Philippines.

South Africa 

The Arabic language is mentioned in the Constitution of South Africa. It declares in Chapter 1 (Founding Provisions) Section 6, Languages that "A Pan South African Language Board established by national legislation must (b) promote and ensure respect for – (i) all languages commonly used by communities in South Africa, including ...; and (ii) Arabic, ... for religious purposes in South Africa."

Non-sovereign entities and territories where Arabic is an official or de facto official language 
The following is a list of non-sovereign entities and autonomous regions as well as territories where Arabic is an official or de facto official language.

History

Umayyad Caliphate 

The Muslim conquests (al-Futūḥāt al-Islāmiyya) and the following Expansion of Islam (Intishar al-Islām) led to the expansion of the Arabic language in Northern Africa, the Iberian Peninsula, the Caucasus, Western Asia, Central Asia and South Asia. Along with the religion of Islam, the Arabic language, Arabic number system and Arab customs spread throughout the entire Arab caliphate. The caliphs of the Arab dynasty established the first schools inside the empire which taught Arabic language and Islamic studies for all pupils in all areas within the caliphate. The result was (in those areas which belonged to the Arab empire) the creation of the society that was mostly Arabic-speaking because of the assimilation of native inhabitants.

During the period of the Umayyad Caliphate (661–750), the 5th Umayyad caliph Abd al-Malik (646–705) established Arabic instead of the local languages as the sole official state language of government across the entire caliphate.

Abbasid Caliphate 
While the Abbasid Caliphate (750–1258) originally gained power by exploiting the social inequalities against non-Arabs in the Umayyad Empire, during Abbasid rule the empire rapidly was Arabized. As knowledge was shared in the Arabic language throughout the empire, people of different nationalities and religions began gradually to speak Arabic in their everyday lives. Resources from other languages began to be translated into Arabic, and a unique Islamic identity began to form that fused previous cultures with Arab culture, creating a level of civilization and knowledge that was considered a marvel in Europe and the Western world.

Fatimid Caliphate 
The Arabic language remained the lingua franca of high culture under the Fatimids (909–1171), Spanish Umayyads (856–1031) in the Iberian Peninsula, and later Muslim dynasties in North Africa and Spain and of the Mamluks (1250–1517) in Egypt and Syria-Palestine.

Al-Andalus 
In the history, Andalusian Arabic was the official language in Spain and Portugal, formerly Al-Andalus for more than 700 years until the fall of the last Islamic state in Iberia at Granada in 1492.

Italy and Malta 
Siculo-Arabic (or Sicilian Arabic) was a spoken language on the islands of Sicily and neighbouring Malta (at that time Emirate of Sicily (831–1091)) between the end of the ninth century and the end of the twelfth century.

Greece 
A form of Arabic was spoken on the Mediterranean island of Crete (Emirate of Crete) from the late 820s (c. 824 or 827/828) until the Byzantine reconquest in 961.

Omani Empire 
Arabic was the official language of the Omani Empire (1696–1856). Several Arabic dialects and languages were the lingua francas in the different areas of this empire, like Omani Arabic, Yemeni Arabic, Persian, Balochi and Swahili.

South Sudan 
Arabic (alongside English) was an official language in South Sudan from 1863 (these days a part of Egypt Eyalet (1517–1867)) until 2011 (that time the independent state Republic of South Sudan), when the former government canceled Arabic as an official language. Since 2011 English is the sole official language of South Sudan. The Arabic dialect Juba Arabic is still the lingua franca of the people in South Sudan.

The Gambia 
In 2014, Gambian president Yahya Jammeh announced that The Gambia would drop English as the official language because it is a "colonial relic". He replaced Gambia's official language English with Arabic in 2014. However, such change was not enacted.

Israel 
The Arabic language (alongside Hebrew) also remained as an official language in the State of Israel for the first 70 years after the proclamation in 1948 until 2018. The Knesset canceled the status of Arabic as an official language by adopting the relevant Basic Law: Israel as the Nation-State of the Jewish People on 19 July 2018. This Israeli Basic Law states in No. 4 (A) that "The state’s language is Hebrew."

Territories where Arabic was an official or de facto official language and later replaced or repealed 
There were several territories (which later became independent states) where Arabic was an official or de facto official language and where Arabic has been replaced by other languages or repealed. The following list specifies territories (which later became independent states) where Arabic was the official language when these territories were parts of the Umayyad Caliphate. During the reign of the fifth Umayyad caliph Abd al-Malik, Arabic became the official language of the Umayyad Caliphate. The previous local official languages in the different territories were replaced by the Arabic language.

See also 
 Arabic
 Arab League
 Arab world
 Modern Standard Arabic
 Varieties of Arabic

Notes

References 

 Official languages by country

Bibliography

Further reading 
 Arab Immigrants in Latin American Politics
 Descendants of Arabs thriving in S. America
 "Arab roots grow deep in Brazil's rich melting pot", The Washington Times

External links 
 List of countries where arab is official language with pictures and flags

Arabic language